The R400 road is a regional road in Ireland, linking Mullingar, County Westmeath to the R419 at Cushina, County Offaly.

Route
It starts in the centre of Mullingar and crosses over the N52 south of the town. 

In Rochfortbridge it joins the R446, (the former N6), then leaves it southwards crossing over the M6 motorway at a grade separated junction. 

Continuing south it enters County Offaly and then for 25 km it crosses the western edge of the Bog of Allen; going through the village of Rhode, crossing the Grand Canal, intersecting with the R402, skirting the village of Walsh Island before terminating in Cushina.

Map of the route
R400 Routemap.

Local name
From its junction with the R402 in the townland of Mount Lucas and Drumcaw until its end at Cushina, the R400 is known locally as the Pike road.

See also
Roads in Ireland
National primary road
National secondary road

References
Roads Act 1993 (Classification of Regional Roads) Order 2006 – Department of Transport

Regional roads in the Republic of Ireland
Roads in County Westmeath
Roads in County Offaly